John Madigan (born 1 September 1994) is an Irish rugby union player. He plays as a lock for French Rugby Pro D2 side Béziers.

Munster
Madigan made his debut for Munster on 5 September 2015, starting in the opening game of the 2015–16 Pro12 against Treviso. On 19 May 2017, it was announced that Madigan would leave Munster at the end of the 2016–17 season.

Career in France
Ahead of the 2017–18 season, Madigan joined French Rugby Pro D2 side RC Massy. He joined Béziers ahead of the 2020–21 season.

References

External links
Munster Profile

Living people
1994 births
Rugby union players from County Cork
Irish rugby union players
Dolphin RFC players
Munster Rugby players
RC Massy players
AS Béziers Hérault players
Rugby union locks
Irish expatriate rugby union players
Irish expatriate sportspeople in France
Expatriate rugby union players in France